Business Tonight was a business news talk show on CNBC until c. October 1997. The show was hosted by Sue Herera. It was replaced by The Edge.

References

CNBC original programming
1990s American television news shows
Year of television series debut missing
1990s American television talk shows
Year of television series ending missing
Business-related television series
1997 American television series endings